The List of artists in the Philadelphia Museum of Art handbook of the collections is a list of the artists indexed in the Philadelphia Museum of Art museum guide. The guide, with an introduction by Anne D'Harnencourt, was produced as a 25th anniversary gift by the Museum Associates in 1995. The museum's collections are spread throughout several locations in Fairmount Park in addition to The Rodin museum and the Neo-classical building at the end of the Benjamin Franklin Parkway.  The entire collection houses over 70,000 objects, thousands of which are on view at any given time. The museum guide has been designed to highlight seven major sections.  In the following list, the artist's name is followed by the location of one of their works and its page number in the guide. For artists with more than one work in the collection, or for works by artists not listed here, see the Philadelphia Museum of Art website or the corresponding Wikimedia Commons category. Of artists listed, only 9 are women.
For the complete list of artists and their artworks in the collection, see the website.

Alvar Aalto (1898-1976), European decorative arts and Arms & Armour : page 156
Robert Adam (1728–1792), European decorative arts and Arms & Armour : page 143
Ansel Adams (1902-1984), Prints, Drawings, and Photographs : page 247
Adriano Fiorentino (ca. 1455–1499), European decorative arts and Arms & Armour : page 116
Thomas Affleck (1740-1795), American Art : page 260
Washington Allston (1779–1843), American Art : page 268
Lawrence Alma-Tadema (1836–1912), European Painting and Sculpture : page 199
Joseph Anthony Jr. (1762-1814), American Art : page 266
Alexander Porfyrovych Archipenko (1887–1964), Twentieth-century Art : page 311
Charles Aubry (1803-1883), Prints, Drawings, and Photographs : page 225
Joseph B. Barry (1757-1838), American Art : page 275
Pompeo Batoni (1708–1787), European Painting and Sculpture : page 182, 221
Max Beckmann (1884–1950), Prints, Drawings, and Photographs : page 240
Benedetto di Bindo (1380/1385-1417), European Painting and Sculpture : page 162
Benjamin Bergey, American Art : page 273
Christoffel van den Berghe (1590–1638), European Painting and Sculpture : page 173
Antoine Berjon (1754–1843), European Painting and Sculpture : page 186
John Bieber, American Art : page 264
William Blake (1757–1827), Prints, Drawings, and Photographs : page 223
Bill Blass (1922-2002), Costume and Textiles : page 101
David Bomberg (1890–1957), Prints, Drawings, and Photographs : page 235
Gerard ter Borch (1617–1681), European Painting and Sculpture : page 177
Michael Botta, European decorative arts and Arms & Armour : page 131
Dieric Bouts (1415–1475), European Painting and Sculpture : page 166
Constantin Brâncuși (1876-1957), Twentieth-century Art : page 314, 320
Jean Brandely, American Art : page 274
Georges Braque (1882–1963), Prints, Drawings, and Photographs : page 237
Bronzino (1503–1572), European Painting and Sculpture : page 170
Edward Burne-Jones (1833–1898), Prints, Drawings, and Photographs : page 227
Giuseppe Cades (1750–1799), Prints, Drawings, and Photographs : page 222
Alexander Calder (1898–1976), Twentieth-century Art : page 337
Julia Margaret Cameron (1815-1879), Prints, Drawings, and Photographs : page 228
Arthur B. Carles (1882–1952), Twentieth-century Art : page 319
Martin Carlin (ca. 1730–1785), European decorative arts and Arms & Armour : page 147
Jean-Baptiste Carpeaux (1827–1875), European Painting and Sculpture : page 190
Mary Cassatt (1844–1926), American Art : page 289
Giovanni Benedetto Castiglione (1609–1664), Prints, Drawings, and Photographs : page 218
Paul Cézanne (1839–1906), European Painting and Sculpture : page 208, 211, 230
Marc Chagall (1887–1985), Twentieth-century Art : page 306
Jean-Baptiste-Siméon Chardin (1699–1779), European Painting and Sculpture : page 180
Eduard Charlemont (1848-1906), European Painting and Sculpture : page 198
Simon Chaudron (1758-1846), American Art : page 271
Thomas Chippendale (1718-1779), European decorative arts and Arms & Armour : page 139
Giorgio de Chirico (1888–1978), Twentieth-century Art : page 309
Giovanni Battista Cipriani (1727-1785), European decorative arts and Arms & Armour : page 143
Francesco Clemente (b.1952), Twentieth-century Art : page 338
Joos van Cleve (1485–1541), European Painting and Sculpture : page 170
Clodion (1738–1814), European decorative arts and Arms & Armour : page 144
Chuck Close (b.1940), Twentieth-century Art : page 342
Charles-Nicolas Cochin (1688–1754), Prints, Drawings, and Photographs : page 221
Comans-La Planche manufactory, European decorative arts and Arms & Armour : page 130
John Constable (1776–1837), European Painting and Sculpture : page 187
Samuel Cooper (1609–1672), European Painting and Sculpture : page 178
Dirck Volckertszoon Coornhert (1522–1590), European decorative arts and Arms & Armour : page 128
Jean-Baptiste-Camille Corot (1796–1875), European Painting and Sculpture : page 188
Gustave Courbet (1819–1877), European Painting and Sculpture : page 192
Charles-Antoine Coypel (1694–1752), European decorative arts and Arms & Armour : page 145
Noël-Nicolas Coypel (1690–1734), European Painting and Sculpture : page 179
Carlo Crivelli (1430/35–1495), European Painting and Sculpture : page 166
Salvador Dalí (1904–1989), Twentieth-century Art : page 323
Gerard David (1460–1523), European Painting and Sculpture : page 165
Thomas J. Davies (active 1862–1870), American Art : page 285
Edgar Degas (1834–1917), European Painting and Sculpture : page 195, 204, 231
Willem de Kooning (1904–1997), Twentieth-century Art : page 326
Eugène Delacroix (1798–1863), European Painting and Sculpture : page 190
Charles Demuth (1883–1935), Prints, Drawings, and Photographs : page 239
Dentzel Carousel Co., American Art : page 296
Derby porcelain, European decorative arts and Arms & Armour : page 141
Jules Desfossé (1816-1890), European decorative arts and Arms & Armour : page 152
Desiderio da Settignano (1428–1464), European decorative arts and Arms & Armour : page 115
Mark di Suvero (b. 1933), Twentieth-century Art : page 336
Christian Dorflinger (1828–1915), American Art : page 287
Brothers Dosso (1469–1542), European Painting and Sculpture : page 171
Marcel Duchamp (1887–1968), Twentieth-century Art : page 307, 316, 317
Raymond Duchamp-Villon (1876-1918), Twentieth-century Art : page 314
Raoul Dufy (1877–1953), Costume and Textiles : page 99
Thomas Eakins (1844–1916), American Art : page 228, 285, 287, 292
Wharton Esherick (1887-1970), American Art : page 298
Frederick H. Evans (1853-1943), Prints, Drawings, and Photographs : page 233
Jan van Eyck (1370–1441), European Painting and Sculpture : page 164
Jean-Jacques Feuchère (1807-1852), European decorative arts and Arms & Armour : page 154
Jacobus Fiamengo, European decorative arts and Arms & Armour : page 128
Alexander Fisher (painter) (1864–1936), Costume and Textiles : page 95
John Flaxman (1755–1826), European decorative arts and Arms & Armour : page 148
Jean Jacques Flipart (1724–1793), Prints, Drawings, and Photographs : page 221
Orazio Fontana (1510-1571), European decorative arts and Arms & Armour : page 122
Manuel Joachim de Franca (1808–1865), American Art : page 274
P.H. Emile Froment-Meurice (1802-1855), European decorative arts and Arms & Armour : page 154
Frank Furness (1839-1912), American Art : page 284
Thomas Gainsborough (1727–1788), European Painting and Sculpture : page 183
Émile Gallé (1846-1904), European decorative arts and Arms & Armour : page 155
Paul Gauguin (1848–1903), European Painting and Sculpture : page 208
Jacques-Fabien Gautier-Dagoty (1716–1785), Prints, Drawings, and Photographs : page 219
François-Thomas Germain (1726–1791), European decorative arts and Arms & Armour : page 141
Giorgio Ghisi (1520–1582), Prints, Drawings, and Photographs : page 217
Teodoro Ghisi (1536-1601), Prints, Drawings, and Photographs : page 217
Giovanni di Paolo (1403–1482), European Painting and Sculpture : page 164
François Girardon (1628–1715), European decorative arts and Arms & Armour : page 136
Girolamo da Treviso the Younger (ca. 1497–1544), European decorative arts and Arms & Armour : page 121
Gobelins Manufactory, European decorative arts and Arms & Armour : page 145
Vincent van Gogh (1853–1890), European Painting and Sculpture : page 203, 207
Hendrik Goltzius (1558–1617), European Painting and Sculpture : page 172, 218
Sidney Goodman (1936-2013), Twentieth-century Art : page 339
Pierre Gouthière (1732–1813), European decorative arts and Arms & Armour : page 146
Juan Gris (1887–1927), Twentieth-century Art : page 313
Benjamin Harbeson, American Art : page 259
Marsden Hartley (1877–1943), Twentieth-century Art : page 311
Maarten van Heemskerck (1498–1574), European decorative arts and Arms & Armour : page 128
Lorenz Helmschmid (1449-1514), European decorative arts and Arms & Armour : page 119
Herculaneum pottery, European decorative arts and Arms & Armour : page 150
Albert Herter (1871–1950), American Art : page 288
Eva Hesse (1936-1970), Twentieth-century Art : page 335
John Hewson (artist) (1744–1821), Costume and Textiles : page 86
Edward Hicks (1780–1849), American Art : page 281
Peter Holl III, American Art : page 265
Josef Hoffmann (1870-1956), Special Collections : page 464
Winslow Homer (1836–1910), American Art : page 291
Hon'ami Koetsu (1558-1637), Asian art : page 43, 44
Hsia Ch'ang (1388-1470), Asian art : page 29
Xu Wei (1521-1593), Asian art : page 31
Christian Huber (b. 1984), American Art : page 265
Richard Humphreys (philanthropist) (1750–1832), American Art : page 262
Huonekalu-ja Rakennustyötehdas Oy, European decorative arts and Arms & Armour : page 156
Ike no Taiga (1723-1776), Asian art : page 46
Jean-Auguste-Dominique Ingres (1780–1867), European Painting and Sculpture : page 185
George Washington Jack (1855-1931), European decorative arts and Arms & Armour : page 151
François-Honoré-Georges Jacob-Desmalter (1770–1841), European decorative arts and Arms & Armour : page 149
Georges Jacob (1739–1814), European decorative arts and Arms & Armour : page 149
Jacob-Desmalter (1770-1841), European decorative arts and Arms & Armour : page 149
Jean de Court (1555–1585), European decorative arts and Arms & Armour : page 126
Jasper Johns (b.1930), Prints, Drawings, and Photographs : page 250, 335
Thomas Johnson (designer) (1714–1778), European decorative arts and Arms & Armour : page 140
Johann Joachim Kändler (1706-1775), European decorative arts and Arms & Armour : page 137
Wassily Kandinsky (1866–1944), Twentieth-century Art : page 312
Eliza M. Kandle (1822-1892), Costume and Textiles : page 90
Kano Hogai (1828-1888), Asian art : page 47
Kitagawa Utamaro (1753-1806), Prints, Drawings, and Photographs : page 225
Paul Klee (1879–1940), Prints, Drawings, and Photographs : page 245, 321
Yves Klein (1928-1962), Twentieth-century Art : page 332
Franz Kline (1910–1962), Twentieth-century Art : page 333
Knoll International, American Art : page 300
Gaston Lachaise (1882–1935), Twentieth-century Art : page 309
John La Farge (1835–1910), American Art : page 297
Paul de Lamerie (1688-1751), European decorative arts and Arms & Armour : page 139
Sir Edwin Henry Landseer (1802–1873), European Painting and Sculpture : page 188
Benjamin Henry Latrobe (1764-1820), American Art : page 269
Hippolyte Le Bas (1782-1867), Costume and Textiles : page 90
Fernand Léger (1881–1955), Twentieth-century Art : page 315
Charles Le Roux (1814-1895), American Art : page 256
Karl Friedrich Lessing (1808–1880), European Painting and Sculpture : page 186
Sol LeWitt (1928-2007), Twentieth-century Art : page 343
Lucas van Leyden (1494–1533), Prints, Drawings, and Photographs : page 216
Liberty & Co., Costume and Textiles : page 96
Josse Lieferinxe (1493–1508), European Painting and Sculpture : page 169
Jacques Lipchitz (1891–1973), Twentieth-century Art : page 330
El Lissitzky (1890-1941), Prints, Drawings, and Photographs : page 240
Richard Long (artist) (b.1945), Prints, Drawings, and Photographs : page 251
José Delores Lopez (1868-1937), American Art : page 299
Pietro Lorenzetti (1280–1348), European Painting and Sculpture : page 162
Filippe Maecht, European decorative arts and Arms & Armour : page 130
Man Ray (1890–1976), Prints, Drawings, and Photographs : page 241
Édouard Manet (1832–1883), European Painting and Sculpture : page 193, 194
Marcello (Duchesse de Castiglione-Colonna) (1836-1879), European Painting and Sculpture : page 194
John Marin (1870–1953), Prints, Drawings, and Photographs : page 235
Masaccio (1401–1428), European Painting and Sculpture : page 163
Masolino da Panicale (1383–1447), European Painting and Sculpture : page 163
Alice Trumbull Mason (1904-1971), Twentieth-century Art : page 326
Henri Matisse (1869–1954), European Painting and Sculpture : page 310, 325
Anton Mauve (1838–1888), European Painting and Sculpture : page 201
Meissen porcelain, European decorative arts and Arms & Armour : page 137
Memphis Group, European decorative arts and Arms & Armour : page 157
Ray K. Metzker (1931-2014), Prints, Drawings, and Photographs : page 248
Clodion (1738–1814), European decorative arts and Arms & Armour : page 144
Sigisbert Michel (1728-1811), European decorative arts and Arms & Armour : page 148
Jean-François Millet (1814–1875), European Painting and Sculpture : page 197
Mintons Ltd., European decorative arts and Arms & Armour : page 153
Joan Miró (1893–1983), Prints, Drawings, and Photographs : page 244, 321
Issey Miyake (b. 1938), Costume and Textiles : page 102
Amedeo Modigliani (1884–1920), Twentieth-century Art : page 319
Piet Mondrian (1872–1944), Twentieth-century Art : page 317
Claude Monet (1840–1926), European Painting and Sculpture : page 196, 209
Thomas Moran (1837–1926), American Art : page 290
James Morisset (1780-1852), European decorative arts and Arms & Armour : page 146
Morris & Co., European decorative arts and Arms & Armour : page 151
Robert Motherwell (1915–1991), Prints, Drawings, and Photographs : page 247
Edouard Muller (painter) (1823–1876), European decorative arts and Arms & Armour : page 152
Munakata Shiko (1903-1975), Asian art : page 47
Elizabeth Murray (artist) (1940–2007), Twentieth-century Art : page 341
Jacques Neilson (1714-1788), European decorative arts and Arms & Armour : page 145
Violet Oakley (1874-1961), Prints, Drawings, and Photographs : page 238
Ōgi Rodō (1863–1941), Asian art : page 48
Ohio Valley China Co., American Art : page 291
Georgia O'Keeffe (1887–1986), Twentieth-century Art : page 329
Claes Oldenburg (b. 1929), Twentieth-century Art : page 338
Orosius master, Prints, Drawings, and Photographs : page 216
Daniel Pabst (1826-1910), American Art : page 284
Elie Pacot (1657-1721), European decorative arts and Arms & Armour : page 135
Maxfield Parrish (1870-1966), Prints, Drawings, and Photographs : page 232
Joachim Patinir (1480–1524), European Painting and Sculpture : page 168
Charles Willson Peale (1741–1827), American Art : page 261, 267
Anton Peffenhauser (1525-1603), European decorative arts and Arms & Armour : page 126
Joseph Perfetti, European decorative arts and Arms & Armour : page 143
Pablo Picasso (1881–1973), Prints, Drawings, and Photographs : page 236, 245, 306, 308, 318
Horace Pippin (1888–1946), Twentieth-century Art : page 329
Giovanni Battista Piranesi (1720–1778), Prints, Drawings, and Photographs : page 220
Camille Pissarro (1830–1903), European Painting and Sculpture : page 203
Paul Poiret (1879-1944), Costume and Textiles : page 97
Jackson Pollock (1912–1956), Twentieth-century Art : page 327
Paulus Potter (1625–1654), European Painting and Sculpture : page 176
Nicolas Poussin (1594–1665), European Painting and Sculpture : page 175
Michael Powolny (1871-1954), European decorative arts and Arms & Armour : page 155
Martin Puryear (b. 1941), Twentieth-century Art : page 340
Pierre-Cécile Puvis De Chavannes (1824–1898), European Painting and Sculpture : page 191
Robert Rauschenberg (1925–2008), Twentieth-century Art : page 334
Osmon Reed, American Art : page 280
Pierre-Auguste Renoir (1841–1919), European Painting and Sculpture : page 196, 200
Joshua Reynolds (1723–1792), European Painting and Sculpture : page 184
Faith Ringgold (b. 1930), Costume and Textiles : page 103
Diego Rivera (1886–1957), Prints, Drawings, and Photographs : page 242, 322
Francesco Maria Rivolta, European decorative arts and Arms & Armour : page 137
Luca della Robbia (1399-1482), European decorative arts and Arms & Armour : page 113
Howard Roberts (1843-1900), American Art : page 286
Auguste Rodin (1840–1917), European Painting and Sculpture : page 199, 201, 210
Rookwood pottery, American Art : page 294
Helen Rose (1904-1985), Costume and Textiles : page 100
James Rosenquist (1933–2017), Twentieth-century Art : page 332
Georges Rouault (1871–1958), Twentieth-century Art : page 323
Henri Rousseau (1844–1910), European Painting and Sculpture : page 202
Peter Paul Rubens (1577–1640), European Painting and Sculpture : page 130, 174
William Rush (1756-1833), American Art : page 276
Santiago Rusinol (1861-1931), European Painting and Sculpture : page 205
Pieter Jansz Saenredam (1597–1665), European Painting and Sculpture : page 173
Augustus Saint-Gaudens (1848–1907), American Art : page 293
Roberto Sambonet (1924-1995), European decorative arts and Arms & Armour : page 156
John Singer Sargent (1856–1925), American Art : page 289
Rebecca Scattergood Savery (1770-1855), Costume and Textiles : page 91
Savonnerie manufactory, European decorative arts and Arms & Armour : page 134
Elsa Schiaparelli (1890-1973), Costume and Textiles : page 98
Emilio Schuberth (1904-1972), Costume and Textiles : page 101
Georges Seurat (1859–1891), Prints, Drawings, and Photographs : page 229
Sèvres porcelain, European decorative arts and Arms & Armour : page 142
Ben Shahn (1898–1969), Twentieth-century Art : page 328
Charles Sheeler (1883–1965), Prints, Drawings, and Photographs : page 243, 324
Kataro Shirayamadani (1865-1948), American Art : page 294
William Sinclair (furniture maker), American Art : page 270
Olaf Skoogfors (1930-1975), American Art : page 299
John French Sloan (1871–1951), American Art : page 233, 294
Frans Snyders (1579–1657), European Painting and Sculpture : page 174
Marc-Louis-Emmanuel Solon (1835-1913), European decorative arts and Arms & Armour : page 153
Ettore Sottsass Jr. (1917-2007), European decorative arts and Arms & Armour : page 157
Rudolf Staffel (1911-2002), American Art : page 300
Jan Steen (1626–1679), European Painting and Sculpture : page 178
Alfred Stieglitz (1864–1946), Prints, Drawings, and Photographs : page 234, 242
Paul Strand (1890–1976), Prints, Drawings, and Photographs : page 238
George Stubbs (1724–1806), European Painting and Sculpture : page 181
Philip Syng Jr. (1703-1789), American Art : page 262
Henry Ossawa Tanner (1859–1937), American Art : page 295
Hans Taye, European decorative arts and Arms & Armour : page 130
Thonet Brothers (1796—1871), European decorative arts and Arms & Armour : page 153
Bertel Thorvaldsen (1770—1844), European decorative arts and Arms & Armour : page 148
Dox Thrash (1893-1965), Prints, Drawings, and Photographs : page 246
Ellen Powell Tiberino (1937-1992), Prints, Drawings, and Photographs : page 249
Giovanni Battista Tiepolo (1696–1770), European Painting and Sculpture : page 182
Louis Comfort Tiffany (1848–1933), American Art : page 296
Tiffany Glass and Decorating Co., American Art : page 296
Johann Heinrich Wilhelm Tischbein (1751-1829), Prints, Drawings, and Photographs : page 224
Shomei Tomatsu (1930-2012), Prints, Drawings, and Photographs : page 249
Henri de Toulouse-Lautrec (1864–1901), European Painting and Sculpture : page 206
William Ellis Tucker (d. 1832), American Art : page 277
Tucker porcelain, American Art : page 277
J. M. W. Turner (1775–1851), European Painting and Sculpture : page 189
Cy Twombly (1928–2011), Twentieth-century Art : page 340
Robert Venturi (1925-2018), American Art : page 300
Scott Brown Venturi, American Art : page 300
Claude Joseph Vernet (1714–1789), European Painting and Sculpture : page 180
Édouard Vuillard (1868–1940), European Painting and Sculpture : page 205, 230
Josiah Wedgwood (1730-1795), European decorative arts and Arms & Armour : page 148
Robert Wellford, American Art : page 266
Adolf Ulrik Wertmüller (1751-1811), American Art : page 269
Benjamin West (1738–1820), European Painting and Sculpture : page 184
Rogier van der Weyden (1400–1464), European Painting and Sculpture : page 167
James Abbott McNeill Whistler (1834–1903), American Art : page 283
David Wiand, Costume and Textiles : page 93
Wiener Keramik, European decorative arts and Arms & Armour : page 155
Charles Frederick Worth (1825-1895), Costume and Textiles : page 94
Andrew Wyeth (1917–2009), Twentieth-century Art : page 331
Juan Ximenez (1470-1510), European Painting and Sculpture : page 168
Yi Am (1499-?), Asian art : page 36
Claire Zeisler (1903-1991), American Art : page 301
Antonio Zucchi (1726–1796), European decorative arts and Arms & Armour : page 143
Francisco de Zurbarán (1598–1664), European Painting and Sculpture : page 176

References
Philadelphia Museum of Art website
 Philadelphia Museum of Art guide on their website
 :commons:Category:Philadelphia Museum of Art
 Netherlands Institute for Art History

Phile
Philadelphia Museum of Art
Philadelphia-related lists